Phytophthora drechsleri is a plant pathogen with many hosts.

Affected plants
See:
 List of potato diseases
 List of maize diseases
 List of almond diseases
 List of apricot diseases
 List of beet diseases
 List of caneberries diseases
 List of cassava diseases
 List of tomato diseases
 List of sunflower diseases
 List of safflower diseases
 List of poinsettia diseases
 List of pigeonpea diseases
 List of peach and nectarine diseases
 List of Persian walnut diseases
 List of chickpea diseases

References

External links
Index Fungorum
USDA ARS Fungal Database

drechsleri
Species described in 1931
Food plant pathogens and diseases
Ornamental plant pathogens and diseases